Heman Humphrey (March 26, 1779 – April 3, 1861) was a 19th-century American author and clergyman who served as a trustee of Williams College and afterward as the second president of Amherst College, a post he held for 22 years.

Early life and education
Humphrey was born in West Simsbury, Hartford County, Connecticut (which became Canton, Connecticut) to farmer Solomon Humphrey, of a family that came from England before 1643, and Hannah, daughter of Captain John Brown.

Humphrey graduated from Yale University with an A.M. in 1805 and was ordained a Congregational minister on March 16, 1807. He became a minister in Fairfield, Connecticut, in 1807, moving to Pittsfield, Massachusetts, in 1817. His 1813 report to the Fairfield Association is one of the earliest temperance tracts published in America. Humphrey is also said to have published six articles in The Panoplist and Missionary Magazine on the cause, origin, effects and remedy of intemperance.

Following his tenure at Williams College, in 1825 he was appointed president of Amherst. He was elected a Fellow of the American Academy of Arts and Sciences in 1842. Humphrey was influential in the nineteenth-century temperance movement and typical of the early proponents of prohibition. He was the father of U.S. Representative James Humphrey.

Bibliography

References

External Links 

 Heman Humphrey Sermons at the Amherst College Archives & Special Collections

1779 births
1861 deaths
American Congregationalist ministers
Fellows of the American Academy of Arts and Sciences
Presidents of Amherst College
People from Simsbury, Connecticut
Yale University alumni
People from Canton, Connecticut
People from Fairfield, Connecticut
19th-century Congregationalist ministers